Awaous ocellaris is a species of goby native to fresh, marine and brackish waters of southern Asia from India to the Philippines, and eastern Asia to Japan as well as the islands of Oceania.  This species can reach a length of  TL.  It is of minor importance to local commercial fisheries.

References

External links
 Photograph

ocellaris
Fish of South Asia
Fish of India
Fish of Japan
Fish of New Caledonia
Fish described in 1782
Taxa named by Pierre Marie Auguste Broussonet